The blind leading the blind is an idiom and a metaphor which can be traced back to the Upanishads, and also appears in the Buddhist Pali Canon, Horace and the Bible.

Art
The Blind Leading the Blind, painting by Pieter Bruegel the Elder, 1568

Music 
"Blind Leading the Blind", Dave Stewart/Mick Jagger track from the 2004 film soundtrack Alfie 
"Blind Leading the Blind", a song by Trivium from Silence in the Snow
"Blind Leading the Blind", a song by Skin Yard from Skin Yard
"Blind Leading the Blind", a song by Raven from Architect of Fear
"Blind Leading the Blind", a song by Mumford & Sons, released as a single in 2019